WVOB (91.3 FM, "Gospel 91") is a radio station broadcasting a Southern Gospel format. Licensed to Dothan, Alabama, United States, the station serves the Dothan area.  The station is currently owned by Bethany Divinity College & Seminary, Inc.

Call sign history
Between 1963 and January 1982, the call sign WVOB was assigned to a radio station in Bel Air, Maryland, which became WHRF.
The call sign meant, "voice of Bel Air."

References

External links

Southern Gospel radio stations in the United States
Radio stations established in 1988
1988 establishments in Alabama
VOB